Koltseyevo is a rural locality (a village) in Kubenskoye Rural Settlement, Vologodsky District, Vologda Oblast, Russia. The population was 66 as of 2002. There are 14 streets.

Geography 
Koltseyevo is located 43 km northwest of Vologda (the district's administrative centre) by road. Novoye is the nearest rural locality.

References 

Rural localities in Vologodsky District